Georgina Osorio (born 12 November 1958) is a Panamanian former swimmer. She competed in three events at the 1976 Summer Olympics.

References

1958 births
Living people
Panamanian female swimmers
Pan American Games competitors for Panama
Swimmers at the 1979 Pan American Games
Olympic swimmers of Panama
Swimmers at the 1976 Summer Olympics
Place of birth missing (living people)